Tyrconnell is a former state in north-west Ireland.

Tyrconnell or Tyrconnel may also refer to:

People 

Earl of Tyrconnell
Viscount Tyrconnel

Places 

Tyrconnell (Towson, Maryland), a historic home located in Baltimore County, Maryland, United States
Tyrconnel, Queensland, a locality in Australia
Tyrconnel Mine and Battery, a heritage-listed former gold mine in Shire of Mareeba, Queensland

Other 

Tyrconnell (whiskey), a brand of single malt Irish whiskey
SS Tyrconnel (1892), a coastal cargo vessel